Siege of Bihać (1697) was a Habsburg siege of Ottoman town of Bihać in Bosnian Krajina (aka Turkish Croatia). The siege was planned as a diversionary attack from main Habsburg offensive on Danube river, and was called off after several failed storming attempts.

Background 

In the first half of 16th century, the town of Bihać was an important Croatian strongpoint in its defensive efforts to counter Ottoman expansion. The town was besieged by the Ottomans in 1592, and eventually surrendered. It subsequently became an important Ottoman outpost for further expansion on the expense of Croatia and other Habsburg lands. Nonetheless, the Ottoman expansion towards Croatia was mostly halted by Battle of Sisak in 1593.

By the second half of 17th century, the Ottoman Empire lost the might it had one century earlier. Nonetheless, the Ottoman Porte decided to go on another offensive and mounted an offensive against Habsburg capital Vienna in 1683, which culminated in Battle of Vienna and Ottoman defeat.

Following this defeat, the military alliance called the Holy League was formed, whose purpose was to push the Ottomans out of Europe. Parallel with main Habsburg efforts against Ottoman Hungary, ban of Croatia and Karlovac Generalcy began their own successful anti-Ottoman campaigns in Slavonia, Pounje and Lika.

Preparations 
In June 1697, the Frontier Army commanded by Karl Auersperg was assembled in Slunj, and marched off to Drežnik. Right in front of Ottoman held Drežnik, the Frontier forces met with Marko Mesić's Lika troops. After being pounded by cannon fire, the Drežnik garrison surrendered to Auersperg. Drežnik was then manned by Croatians, after which the joint Frontier-Lika army continued its march to Bihać. The arrival of ban's army was complicated due to them breaking through Pounje, where they captured and burnt down Bile Stine.

Siege 
After deploying infantry and artillery around Bihać, the town was completely surrounded throughout the next two days. At the same time, reconnaissance parties were sent across Una river, to look for arrival of any Ottoman relief armies heading towards besieged Bihać. The Croatian ban himself arrived on June 20 to participate in action. The Habsburg commanders, after assesing on 24 June that artillery had done enough damage to the city walls, ordered to charge the city. The charge was repulsed and the attackers suffered high casualties. This encouraged the Bihać defenders and they commenced a sortie on the Christian camp on June 28, which inflicted even more casualties to the besieging army. On June 29, disappointed the Croatian ban became sick, so he decided to withdraw. Quarrels also appeared between Germans and Croatians in the imperial army. In the end, the order came from Vienna to abandon the siege completely, in order to re-deploy these attacking troops to the Habsburg main offensive.  On 3 July, the siege was completely called off.

Aftermath 
The remains of besieging army joined other imperial forces in their offensives in Hungary. The failure at Bihać caused disappointment in Croatia. Historian Vjekoslav Klaić points out that when one year later emperor Leopold decided to conclude peace with the Ottomans, "Croats lost all hope of liberating Bihać [...] which was considered capital of Old Croatia in the aftermath of fall of Knin" in 1522.

References 

History of Bihać
Bihać
Bihać
Bihać
17th-century military history of Croatia
Bihać